Syrnola clavellosa is a species of sea snail, a marine gastropod mollusk in the family Pyramidellidae, the pyrams and their allies.

Distribution
This marine species occurs off the Solomon Islands.

References

 Peñas A. & Rolán E. (2016). Deep water Pyramidelloidea from the central and South Pacific. 3. The tribes Eulimellini and Syrnolini. Universidade de Santiago de Compostela. 304 pp

External links
 To World Register of Marine Species
 Melvill, J. C. (1906). Descriptions of thirty-one Gastropoda and one scaphopod from the Persian Gulf and Gulf of Oman, dredged by Mr. F.W. Townsend, 1902-1904. Proceedings of the Malacological Society of London. 7(2): 69-80, pls 7-8
 Melvill, J. C. (1910). A revision of the species of the family Pyramidellidae occurring in the Persian Gulf, Gulf of Oman and North Arabian Sea, as exemplified mostly in the collections made by Mr. F.W. Townsend (1893-1900), with descriptions of new species. iProceedings of the Malacological Society of London. 9: 171-207, pls 4-6

Pyramidellidae
Gastropods described in 1906